Surattha luteola is a moth in the family Crambidae. It was described by Graziano Bassi and Wolfram Mey in 2011. It is found in Angola, Namibia and South Africa.

References

Ancylolomiini
Moths of Africa
Moths described in 2011